Olivier Pironneau (born 1945) is a French mathematician who is a professor at the Université Pierre et Marie Curie and member of the French Academy of Sciences.

Pironneau is a worldwide recognized expert in computational fluid dynamics, scientific computing, computational engineering, optimal design, numerical analysis and partial differential equations.  He is a highly cited author, having written 8 books and 693 papers. He is a member of French Academy of Sciences since 2002. He was awarded the Marcel Dassault Prize by the French Academy of Sciences in 2000. He is also the recipient of the Blaise Pascal Prize of the French Academy of Sciences in 1983, the Ordre National du Mérite (1989) and is an Associate member of the Russian Academy of Sciences since 2004. His group has developed the software FreeFem++ which is used by researchers worldwide for finite element computations.

Selected bibliography

See also
Partial differential equations
Scientific computing
Finite elements
List of École Polytechnique alumni

References

External links

Olivier Pironneau's Home page

1945 births
Living people
20th-century French mathematicians
21st-century French mathematicians
Members of the French Academy of Sciences
Academic staff of Pierre and Marie Curie University
École Polytechnique alumni